The name Elmarit is used by Leica to designate camera lenses that have a maximum aperture of f/2.8.

History
The Elmarit is a derivation of the Elmar. Confusingly not all f/2.8 lenses are Elmarits. The 50 mm f/2.8 collapsible, manufactured until 2007, was designated an Elmar rather than an Elmarit.

Description
The Elmarit are popular lenses for extreme focal lengths: 21 mm, 24 mm, 28 mm and 90 mm. The Elmarit has also come in 135mm super-telephoto.

Market positions
The Elmarit are behind the Summicron and the Summarit lenses. Only the Elmar and most Summaron lenses have a smaller f-number.

List of Elmarit lenses

For the Leica M mount
 Elmarit-M 21 mm 
 Elmarit-M 21 mm  ASPH.
 Elmarit-M 24 mm  ASPH.
 Elmarit-M 28 mm 
 Elmarit-M 28 mm  ASPH.
 Elmarit-M 90 mm 
 Elmarit-M 135 mm 

For the Leica R mount
 Leica 15 mm  Super-Elmarit-R ASPH – 2001
 Leica 16 mm  Fisheye-Elmarit-R – 1970 (Minolta design and glass production)
 Leica 19 mm  Elmarit-R 1st version
 Leica 19 mm  Elmarit-R 2nd version – 1990
 Leica 24 mm  Elmarit-R – 1970 (Minolta design and glass production)
 Leica 28 mm  Elmarit-R 1st version – 1970
 Leica 28 mm  Elmarit-R 2nd version – 1994
 Leica 35 mm  Elmarit-R 1st version – 1964
 Leica 35 mm  Elmarit-R 2nd version
 Leica 35 mm  Elmarit-R 3rd version
 Leica 35 mm  Elmarit-R 4th version (Built-in lens hood; 55mm filter)
 Leica 60 mm Macro-Elmarit-R 1st version – 1972 – outside bayonet lens hood fitting
 Leica 60 mm Macro-Elmarit-R dn2 version
 Leica 90 mm  Elmarit-R 1st version – 1964–1996
 Leica 90 mm  Elmarit-R 2nd version – 1983
 Leica 100 mm  APO-Macro-Elmarit-R
 Leica 135 mm Elmarit-R 1st version – 1965
 Leica 135 mm Elmarit-R 2nd version
 Leica 180 mm  Elmarit-R 1st version
 Leica 180 mm  Elmarit-R 2nd version
 Leica 180 mm  APO-Elmarit-R – 1998
 Leica 28 mm-90 mm -4.5 Vario-Elmarit-R ASPH
 Leica 70–180 mm  Vario-APO-Elmarit-R zoom
 Leica 35–70 mm  Vario-Elmarit-R ASPH zoom – 2000 (only 200 were made)

For the Leica S mount
 Super-Elmar-S 1:3.5/24 mm ASPH.
 Elmarit-S 1:2.8/30 mm ASPH.
 Elmarit-S 1:2.8/30 mm ASPH. CS
 Elmarit-S 1:2.8/45 mm ASPH.
 Elmarit-S 1:2.8/45 mm ASPH. CS

For the Leica L Mount
 Vario-Elmarit-SL 1:2.8–4 / 24–90 ASPH.
 APO-Vario-Elmarit-SL 1:2.8–4 / 90–280
 Elmarit-TL 18 mm f/2.8 ASPH.

References

External links
 

Leica lenses
Photographic lenses